Henry Martyn Spofford (September 8, 1821 – August 20, 1880) was a judge of the Louisiana Supreme Court, born in Gilmanton, New Hampshire. He graduated from Amherst College and relocated to Louisiana, in 1845, where he practiced law. Spofford was elected to the Louisiana Supreme Court and served until 1858, when he resigned to return to his law practice.

Spofford was married on January 7, 1861, to Ophelia Jane Martin (1832-1894), daughter of Judge Thomas Martin of Pulaski, Tennessee.  They had three children:  Eleanor Spofford, Thomas Martin Spofford and Nina Spofford.

Spofford was elected in 1877 to the United States Senate by one of two contesting Louisiana legislatures after the disputed election of 1876, but he was never seated.

After the contested election of 1876, Democrat-backed legislature, allied with Democratic Governor Francis T. Nicholls selected Spofford as United States Senator. However the Republican-dominated legislature allied with Republican Governor Stephen B. Packard had separately selected William Pitt Kellogg. The United States Senate, which was at the time dominated by the so-called Radical faction of the Republican party, refused to seat Spofford.

He died in Red Sulphur Springs, West Virginia.

See also
 List of United States senators from Louisiana at Class 3

Notes

People from Gilmanton, New Hampshire
Amherst College alumni
Justices of the Louisiana Supreme Court
Louisiana Democrats
1821 births
1880 deaths
19th-century American judges